Neomorphaster is a genus of echinoderms belonging to the family Stichasteridae.

The species of this genus are found in Atlantic Ocean.

Species:

Neomorphaster forcipatus 
Neomorphaster margaritaceus

References

Stichasteridae
Asteroidea genera